Peter Hathaway Capstick (1940–1996) was an American hunter and author.  He was born in New Jersey and educated at the University of Virginia although he was not a graduate. Capstick walked away from a successful Wall Street career shortly before his thirtieth birthday to become a professional hunter.  His hunting career began in Central and South America and culminated with hunts in Africa for which he is best known. Capstick spent much of his life in Africa, a land he called his "source of inspiration". A chain smoker and heavy drinker, he died at age 56 from complications following heart surgery.

Biography
After a short career as a Wall Street stockbroker, Capstick headed to Latin America, where he traveled widely while hunting, fishing, and mastering the Spanish language. A few years later he returned to New York, where he founded a business arranging professionally guided hunting trips. Shortly thereafter, he took a position as Hunting and Fishing Director at Winchester Adventures of New York, a subsidiary of the famous gun manufacturer. In that capacity, he made his first trip to Africa in 1968. Subsequently, he worked as a professional hunter and game ranger in Zambia, Botswana, and Rhodesia.

Capstick started writing about his adventures in the late 1960s and published numerous articles in various sporting magazines. In 1977, he published his first book, Death in the Long Grass, which became a commercial success and established his reputation as an author of true adventure stories. 
Capstick is frequently compared to Ernest Hemingway and Robert Ruark in discussions of influential African hunting authors.

Death
In early 1996, Capstick was a keynote speaker at the annual Safari Club International convention in Reno, Nevada, when he collapsed in his hotel room and was diagnosed with exhaustion. He was immediately flown back to his adopted country of South Africa and underwent heart bypass surgery in a Pretoria hospital. He died just before midnight on March 13 of complications from surgery.

After a small private ceremony, his ashes were scattered over the Chobe River in northeastern Botswana.

Legacy
The .470 Capstick rifle cartridge, developed by A-Square's Colonel Arthur B. Alphin in 1990, bears his name. Additionally, his legacy is saluted by The Dallas Safari Club's annual Peter Hathaway Capstick Hunting Heritage Award for the promotion of responsible hunting and wildlife conservation.

Bibliography
A Man Called Lion
The African Adventurers: A Return To Silent Places
Death in a Lonely Land
Death in the Dark Continent
Death in the Long Grass
Death in the Silent Places
The Last Ivory Hunter
Last Horizons
Maneaters
Peter Capstick's Africa: A Return To The Long Grass
Sands of Silence
Safari: the Last Adventure
Warrior: the Legend of Colonel Richard Meinertzhagen

Filmography
Capstick published a series of hunting videos over the years.
Capstick - Botswana Safari
Capstick - Hunting the White Rhino
Capstick - Hunting the African Elephant
Capstick - Hunting the African Lion
Capstick - Hunting the Cape Buffalo
Capstick's Last Safari

See also
 List of famous big game hunters

References

1940 births
1996 deaths
American hunters
American non-fiction outdoors writers
20th-century American non-fiction writers
20th-century American male writers
American male non-fiction writers